Mamadi Kaba (born June 15, 1982) is a Guinean footballer who currently plays for AS Kaloum Star.

Club career
Born in Kankan, Kaba played football for local side AS Kaloum Star before spells in Europe with FC Lugano and FC Gueugnon. At the club level, Kaba previously played for FC Gueugnon in France.

International career
Kaba was also part of the Guinean 2004 African Nations Cup team, which finished second in its group in the first round of competition, before losing in the quarter finals to Mali.

References

External links 

1982 births
Living people
Guinean footballers
Guinean expatriate footballers
Guinea international footballers
Association football defenders
FC Lugano players
FC Gueugnon players
AS Kaloum Star players
Expatriate footballers in Switzerland
Expatriate footballers in France
2004 African Cup of Nations players
2006 Africa Cup of Nations players
People from Kankan
Guinée Championnat National players
Guinean expatriate sportspeople in Switzerland
Guinean expatriate sportspeople in France